The 30th Avenue station (formerly 30th Avenue–Grand Avenue station) is a local station on the BMT Astoria Line of the New York City Subway. It is located at 30th Avenue and 31st Street in Astoria. The station is served by the N train at all times, as well as by the W train on weekdays.

History 
This station opened on February 1, 1917, along with the rest of the Astoria Line, which was originally part of the IRT, as a spur off the IRT Queensboro Line, which is now the IRT Flushing Line. Trains ran between Grand Central and Astoria. On July 23, 1917, the Queensboro Bridge spur of the elevated IRT Second Avenue Line opened. At that time, all elevated trains to Queensboro Plaza used the Astoria Line while all subway trains used the IRT Flushing Line, though this was later changed with trains alternating between branches. This station started to be served by BMT shuttles using elevated cars on April 8, 1923.

The city government took over the BMT's operations on June 1, 1940, and the IRT's operations on June 12, 1940. On October 17, 1949, the Astoria Line became BMT-only as the tracks at Queensboro Plaza were consolidated and the platforms on the Astoria Line were shaved back to allow BMT trains to operate on it. Service was initially provided by the Brighton Local (BMT 1) and the Broadway–Fourth Avenue Local (BMT 2) at all times.

Station renovations 

The project cost $863,000. Signals on the line had to be modified to take the platform extensions into account.

Under the 2015–2019 MTA Capital Plan, the station underwent a complete overhaul as part of the Enhanced Station Initiative and was entirely closed for several months. Updates included cellular service, Wi-Fi, USB charging stations, interactive service advisories and maps. The award for Package 2 of the renovations, which covered renovations at the 30th Avenue, Broadway, 36th Avenue, and 39th Avenue stations, was awarded on April 14, 2017, to Skanska USA. This station, along with 36th Avenue, was closed entirely for around eight months starting on October 23, 2017. After the 30th Avenue and 36th Avenue stations closed, there was some controversy over the loss of business near these stations. The stations reopened on June 22, 2018. In July 2018, the MTA retroactively awarded a contract for the additional platform and girder repairs at the 30th and 36th Avenues stations, conducted after the stations had reopened.

Station layout

This elevated station has two side platforms and three tracks. The center track is not used in revenue service, but it had been used regularly as recently as 2002.

The platforms are narrower at their south ends. The ends of each platform contain full-height mesh windscreens, while the center of the platform contains glass windscreens and black metal canopies. Prior to the 2018 renovations, both platforms had creme-colored corrugated windscreens for their entire lengths and red wooden canopies at the platforms' centers.

The 2018 artwork at this station, Perasma I and II; Dappleganger by Stephen Westfall, consists of laminated glass panels in the mezzanine.

Exits
This station's only mezzanine is an elevated wooden station house beneath the center of the platforms and tracks. It has a turnstile bank and two staircases for each platform. A crossunder is behind the token booth on the north side. A passageway on each side behind the platform stairs leads to a staircase going down to either southern corners of 31st Street and 30th Avenue. Two staircases on the other side go down to the northern corners. An exit-only stair from the northbound platform descends to the southeastern corner of Newtown Avenue and 31st Street.

References

External links 
 
 30th Avenue entrance from Google Maps Street View
 Platforms from Google Maps Street View

1917 establishments in New York City
Astoria, Queens
BMT Astoria Line stations
New York City Subway stations in Queens, New York
Railway stations in the United States opened in 1917